Neil Molloy (April 22, 1948 – December 31, 2007) was an American politician who served in the Missouri House of Representatives from 1985 to 1993.

He died on December 31, 2007, in St. Louis, Missouri at age 59.

References

1948 births
2007 deaths
Democratic Party members of the Missouri House of Representatives
20th-century American politicians
Politicians from St. Louis